Baby Come to Me may refer to:

"Baby, Come to Me" (Patti Austin and James Ingram song)
"Baby Come to Me" (Regina Belle song)